Joseph Alexandre "Patsy" Séguin (May 2, 1887 – August 8, 1918) was a Canadian professional ice hockey player. He played two games with the Montreal Canadiens of the National Hockey Association in the inaugural 1910 season, and scored one goal for the club. He was killed in action while serving in World War I in the Battle of Amiens.

Playing style
Séguin was a small player in stature who liked to play rough and mix it up with his opponents on the ice. In 1912 Edgar Dey of the Halifax Socials was fined $50 by Halifax magistrate's court in Nova Scotia for assaulting Séguin in a January 5 MPHL game. Dey himself died the following month on February 13 from chest injuries thought to stem partly from his tussle with Séguin.

References

External links
Patrick Seguin at JustSportsStats

1887 births
1918 deaths
Canadian military personnel killed in World War I
Montreal Canadiens (NHA) players
Ice hockey people from Montreal
Canadian ice hockey left wingers
Military personnel from Montreal